Cago is the fourth studio album by the Belgian rock band Dead Man Ray, released in 2002. The album was produced by Steve Albini and recorded at his Electrical Audio studios in Chicago, Illinois. The album also derives its title from the name Chicago.  Track 7 "Blue Volkswagen 10:10 AM" has lyrics co-written by Daan and Ken Nordine, an American voiceover and recording artist best known for his series of Word Jazz albums.

Track listing
 All music by Dead Man Ray.
"Landslide" – 5:20
"Centrifugitives" – 5:04
"Crossfaders" – 4:55
"A Single Thing" – 4:09
"Short Term Investments" – 5:10
"Authentic" – 6:37
"Blue Volkswagen 10.10 AM" – 5:52
"Things That Will Happen Again" – 5:23
"Need" – 4:29
"Losing the Lost" – 4:15

Dead Man Ray albums
2002 albums
Albums produced by Steve Albini